The sepak takraw competitions at the 2017 Southeast Asian Games in Kuala Lumpur took place at Titiwangsa Indoor Stadium in Kuala Lumpur.

The 2017 Games featured competitions in 8 sepaktakraw event and 4 chinlone event.

Men's doubles

Round robin

Women's doubles

Group stage

Group A

Group B

Knockout stage

Semifinals

Finals

Men's regu

Round robin

Women's regu

Round robin

Men's quadrant

Group stage

Group A

Group B

Knockout stage

Semifinals

Finals

Women's quadrant

Round robin

Men's team doubles

Group stage

Group A

Group B

Knockout stage

Semifinals

Finals

Men's team regu

Round robin

Chinlone Event 1
The round robin and finals were held on 17 August 2017.

Round robin

Finals

Chinlone Event 2
The round robin and finals were held on 16 August 2017.

Round robin

Finals

Chinlone Event 3
The round robin and finals were held on 16 August 2017.

Round robin

Finals

Chinlone Event 4
The round robin and finals were held on 17 August 2017.

Round robin

Finals

References

External links
  

R